Sekolah Menengah Kebangsaan Subang Jaya (SMKSJ, formerly Sekolah Menengah Subang Jaya) is a secondary school in Subang Jaya, Selangor, Malaysia. It was the first school to be established in the Subang Jaya region in 1981. Due to the lack of classrooms, SMK Subang Utama was built to accommodate the students residing in Subang Jaya.

History 
SMK Subang Jaya was established on January 1, 1981. Initially, there were only four buildings, which were two blocks consisting of classrooms, a canteen and a workshop. Block C which had two laboratories and sixty-nine classrooms was built in 1985.

A prayer room was built in 1986 and in 1990 and an additional building was built at the end of Block A and Block B. Each building has six additional classrooms, while a "TASKA" was built in 1992. This had to be closed due to the lack of classrooms.

SMKSJ was selected as the "School of Hope" in Selangor state level in 1993, while in the national level, SMKSJ was ranked second.

The Pursuing Gold Council was formed on June 16, 1993, with Muhammad Muhammad Taib, the then Menteri Besar of Selangor as patron. Its objective was to produce two gold medal-winning athletes (male and female) among students of SMKSJ in the 1998 SUKOM 1998 Commonwealth Games.

With the effort of Puan Sri To' Puan Rohani Awang Chik, the ninth principal, a hall was completed in 1994 and named Dewan Sri SMKSJ after her. It was officially opened by Wan Zahid Nordin, Director General of Education at that time on June 29, 1995.

In his opening speech, he described SMKSJ as "An Ordinary School with Extraordinary headmistress, teachers and pupils".

Notable alumni 

 Ong Beng Hee, squash player
 Joel Neoh Eu-Jin, entrepreneur, speaker, and investor

References

External links 
 

Schools in Selangor
Secondary schools in Malaysia
Publicly funded schools in Malaysia
Educational institutions established in 1981
1981 establishments in Malaysia